Ash Thomas is a village in Devon, England.

Ash Thomas was listed in the Domesday Book of 1086.

There is a village hall in Ash Thomas.

References

External links
 
 

Villages in Devon